Timothy Douglas Davie  (born 25 April 1967 in Croydon, London) is the current and seventeenth Director-General of the BBC. He succeeded Lord Hall of Birkenhead in the role on 1 September 2020.

Educated at Whitgift School and the University of Cambridge, Davie joined the BBC following a career in marketing. He unsuccessfully stood as a candidate for the Conservative Party in 1993 and 1994 in the Hammersmith and Fulham London Borough Council elections. He was appointed acting Director-General of the BBC in 2012, following George Entwistle's resignation in November 2012 until Lord Hall took over the role permanently in April 2013. During his time as acting director-general he oversaw the investigations into BBC management and conduct following revelations the broadcaster had known about sexual abuse by Jimmy Savile.<ref>BBC Press Release "Incoming BBC Director-General Tony Hall announces changes to BBC’s senior team", 'BBC Press Centre, 14 February 2013</ref>

Early life and career
Davie attended Whitgift School, a private school, in the London Borough of Croydon on a scholarship between 1980 and 1985. He studied English at Selwyn College, Cambridge. Davie joined Procter & Gamble as a trainee in 1991. Two years later he joined PepsiCo eventually becoming vice-president of marketing and finance before leaving the company in 2005. Davie unsuccessfully stood as a councillor for the Conservative Party in the Hammersmith and Fulham London Borough Council elections in 1993 and 1994 and was deputy chairman of the Hammersmith and Fulham Conservative Association in the 1990s.

BBC career
Davie joined the BBC as Director of Marketing, Communications and Audiences in April 2005, succeeding Andy Duncan. He was Director-General Mark Thompson's first senior external appointment.

In June 2008, it was announced that he was replacing Jenny Abramsky, who served at the BBC for 39 years before leaving to chair the Heritage Lottery Fund.  Appointed Director of Audio & Music, he sat on the BBC's Executive Board with overall responsibility for all of the BBC's national radio networks and the corporation's music output across all media. This included BBC Radio 1, BBC Radio 2, BBC Radio 3 and BBC Radio 4; as well as the BBC digital radio stations BBC Asian Network, BBC Radio 1Xtra, BBC Radio 6 Music and BBC Radio 4 Extra (then BBC 7); the three BBC Orchestras based in England; and The Proms. During this time he was involved in abandoned plans to close down Radio 6 Music and the Asian Network. In July 2009 he was on The Guardian's list of the 100 most influential people in the media.

Davie took over as acting Director-General on 11 November 2012 following the resignation of George Entwistle in the wake of the Newsnight'' broadcast which did not name any individual but which led to Internet speculation which incorrectly identified Conservative Lord McAlpine in the North Wales child abuse case.  He became chief executive officer of BBC Worldwide following the appointment of Tony Hall. BBC Worldwide merged with the TV-making arm of the BBC, BBC Studios, in April 2018 and Davie served as both the Chief Executive of BBC Studios and a Director globally.

He was awarded a CBE in 2018, for services to international trade. In 2019 he earned £642,000 and was the BBC's highest paid executive.

In January 2020, Tony Hall announced he was resigning from the Director-General's position before the scheduled end of his tenure. In May 2020, Davie was one of four candidates shortlisted to succeed Hall in the position. On 5 June 2020, it was announced he would become the corporation's seventeenth Director-General from 1 September.

As Director-General
In September 2020, appearing before the Digital, Culture, Media and Sport Committee, Davie justified the salary of BBC's highest paid star Gary Lineker saying the salary was worth it because of the value of analysis to the viewing audience.

In October 2020, he set out new guidelines for BBC staff, stating that they should avoid expressing their personal views on current issues of political controversy (which he called 'virtue signalling') on their own private social media accounts.  He said this was to reduce perceived bias in the BBC. This would include a ban on news reporters taking part in "public demonstrations or gatherings about controversial issues", with some BBC managers citing trans rights and Black Lives Matter as examples. Davie later said that journalists could attend events such as Pride marches if they were "celebratory" and not "taking a stand on politicised or contested issues".

Davie has stated "As editor in chief of the BBC I think one of our founding principles is impartiality and that’s what we are delivering on". In August 2020 he announced his intention for the BBC to "find a better balance of satirical targets rather than constantly aiming jokes at the Tories." He has announced his support of the licence fee as opposed to a Netflix style subscription service.

In December 2021, Davie was elected to the Executive Board of the European Broadcasting Union. He was re-elected in December 2022 to serve a further two years on the Board, until December 2024.

Directorships

Davie is Chairman of Comic Relief, Trustee of the Tate and the Royal Television Society, and in 2018 was appointed as Chairman of the Creative Industries Council.

Previously, he has been on the boards of Freesat, Digital UK and Children in Need.

Personal life
Davie is married and has three sons. He is a keen runner.

References

External links 
 

1967 births
Alumni of Selwyn College, Cambridge
People from Croydon
BBC executives
BBC Board members
Living people
People educated at Whitgift School
Directors-General of the BBC
Conservative Party (UK) people
British marketing people